

Quantitative phase contrast microscopy or quantitative phase imaging are the collective names for a group of microscopy methods that quantify the phase shift that occurs when light waves pass through a more optically dense object.

Translucent objects, like a living human cell, absorb and scatter small amounts of light.
This makes translucent objects much easier to observe in ordinary light microscopes.
Such objects do, however, induce a phase shift that can be observed using a phase contrast microscope.
Conventional phase contrast microscopy and related methods, such as differential interference contrast microscopy, visualize phase shifts by transforming phase shift gradients into intensity variations.
These intensity variations are mixed with other intensity variations, making it difficult to extract quantitative information.

Quantitative phase contrast methods are distinguished from conventional phase contrast methods in that
they create a second so-called phase shift image or phase image, independent of the intensity (bright field) image.
Phase unwrapping methods are generally applied to the phase shift image to give absolute phase shift
values in each pixel, as exemplified by Figure 1.

The principal methods for measuring and visualizing phase shifts include ptychography and various types
of holographic microscopy methods such as digital holographic microscopy,
holographic interference microscopy and digital in-line holographic microscopy.
Common to these methods is that an interference pattern (hologram) is recorded by a digital image sensor.
From the recorded interference pattern, the intensity and the phase shift image is numerically created by a computer algorithm.

Quantitative phase contrast microscopy is primarily used to observed unstained living cells.
Measuring the phase delay images of biological cells provides quantitative information about the morphology and the drymass of individual cells.
Contrary to conventional phase contrast images, phase shift images of living cells are suitable to be processed by image analysis software.
This has led to the development of non-invasive live cell imaging and automated cell culture analysis systems based on quantitative phase contrast microscopy.

See also
 Cytometry
 Digital holographic microscopy
 Holographic interference microscopy
 Live cell imaging
 Phase-contrast microscopy
 Ptychography
 Time stretch quantitative phase imaging

References

External links
 Phase shift time-lapse microscopy video of a triploid cell division
 Cell identification with computational 3D holographic microscopy

Microscopy
Cell imaging
Microbiology techniques
Laboratory techniques
Laboratory equipment
Optical microscopy